There have been several significant famines in the history of Bengal (now independent Bangladesh and the Indian state of West Bengal) including:

Bengal famine may refer to:

 Great Bengal famine of 1770
 Bengal famine of 1873–1874
 Bengal famine of 1943
 Bangladesh famine of 1974

See also 
 Famine in India
Akaler Shandhaney (1982), a film about the 1943 Bengal famine
 Churchill's Secret War (2010), a book about the 1943 famine
 Distant Thunder (1973 film) (1973), a film about the 1943 famine
 Late Victorian Holocausts (2000), a book discussing the 1943 famine